The United Nations University Institute on Computing and Society (UNU-CS) is an institute of the United Nations University (UNU), located in São Lázaro, Macau, China.

Overview
Established in 2015, UNU-CS intends to assist the United Nations to achieve its agenda by working as a bridge between the UN and the international academic and public policy communities, training the next generation of interdisciplinary scientists in computing, social sciences, and design for international development.

UNU-CS succeeds the United Nations University International Institute for Software Technology (UNU-IIST), which was created by the United Nations University in Macau in 1991 following the agreement between the UN, the governments of Macau, Portugal, and China. After the Transfer of sovereignty over Macau, UNU-IIST lost some level of visibility. In 2015, the UNU-CS director Professor Michael L. Best was in charge of building the new succeeding institute "from scratch".

Goal
The goal of UNU-CS is "to nurture the next generation of computer and social scientists with the ability to participate in, shape and benefit from the rapid development of the global information society."

A research start-up, UNU-CS aims to do the following:
 Lead in investigating and inventing human-centred information and communication technologies addressing some of the priorities central to the United Nations such as: sustainability, development, governance, peace and security, human rights and human dignity.
 Impact policymakers, within the UN system and beyond, through actionable knowledge and thought-leadership.
 Nurture the next generation of inter-disciplinary computing, information and social scientists; and engineers in developing countries.
 Embrace the enormous dynamism of the city of Macau and Pearl River Delta region while still working globally.

According to its founding director, Professor Michael Best, his goal is "to raise the profile of the Institute as a centre of excellence in the UN system effectively responding to the needs of the developing world in this crucially important area".

Director
As of 2015, Professor Best directs the Technologies and International Development Lab as an associate professor at the Sam Nunn School of International Affairs and the School of Interactive Computing at Georgia Institute of Technology. He is also a co-founder and editor-in-chief emeritus of the journal Information Technologies and International Development and a faculty associate of the Berkman Center for Internet and Society at Harvard University.

Professor Best leads the Global Computing column for Communications of the ACM. He holds a PhD from MIT and has served as director of Media Lab Asia in India and head of the  group at the MIT Media Lab.

Laboratories
Three "action-oriented research labs" are being developed:
Digital Peace Lab: ICTs for peacebuilding and to support human security, respond to crises, and mitigate human displacement.
Gender Tech Lab: ICTs that promote women's empowerment and enable sustainable community led development.
Small Data Lab: ICTs that create actionable knowledge from local data, empower citizens with data they trust, and improve global datasets with local data.

References

External links

 United Nations University Institute on Computing and Society
 United Nations University headquarters website

2015 establishments in Macau
Educational institutions established in 2015
Computer science departments
International research institutes
Research institutes in China
Computer science institutes
United Nations organizations based in Asia
Universities in Macau
Institute on Computing and Society
Development studies